Thomas Tancred "Tom" Farley (November 10, 1934 – August 23, 2010) was an American lawyer and politician.

Born in Pueblo, Colorado, Farley graduated from Pueblo Catholic High School in 1952. He then received his bachelor's degree in economics from Santa Clara University in 1956. Farley then received his law degree from University of Colorado Law School. Farley practiced law in Pueblo, Colorado. Farley served in the Colorado House of Representatives from 1965 to 1974 and was a Democrat. He died in a Pueblo hospital from pancreatic cancer.

Notes

1934 births
2010 deaths
People from Pueblo, Colorado
Santa Clara University alumni
University of Colorado Law School alumni
Colorado lawyers
Democratic Party members of the Colorado House of Representatives
20th-century American politicians
20th-century American lawyers
Deaths from cancer in Colorado
Deaths from pancreatic cancer